The Yamashio Maru class consisted of a pair of auxiliary escort carriers operated by the Imperial Japanese Army during World War II. They were converted from tankers. Only the name ship was completed during the war and she was sunk by American aircraft before she could be used.

Construction
In 1944, the Japanese Army, which had already converted two passenger liners into combined assault ship and aircraft carriers, decided to acquire its own escort carriers to provide aerial anti-submarine cover for troop convoys. It therefore chartered two partly built Type 2TL Tankers, Yamashio Maru and Chigusa Maru, for conversion to auxiliary escort carriers.

The conversion was extremely simple, with a -long flush flight deck added. There was no hangar, the ship's eight Ki-76s being stored on deck. Defensive armament consisted of sixteen 25 mm anti-aircraft guns, with a depth charge projector forward.

Operational history
Yamashio Maru commissioned on 27 January 1945 and was sunk at Yokohama harbor by US aircraft on 17 February. Plans were drawn up for conversion to a coal-burning freighter, but she was never used as a carrier. Her sister ships, Chigusa Maru and Zuiun Maru, were incomplete when Japan surrendered and served after the war as tankers:

Chigusa Maru was sunk in 1945. The ship was repaired as tanker in 1945 and scrapped in Sasebo in June 1963. Zuiun Maru was scrapped in Oskata on 15 June 1964.

Photo

See also
 Imperial Japanese Army Railways and Shipping Section

Notes

Bibliography

External links
 Escort Aircraft Carriers

Escort carriers of the Imperial Japanese Army
Escort aircraft carrier classes
 
Ships built by Mitsubishi Heavy Industries
Postwar Japan